Ira Daneek Miller (born November 6, 1960) is an American politician who served as the Council Member for the 27th district of the New York City Council. He is a Democrat.

The district included Cambria Heights, Hollis, Jamaica, Jamaica Estates, Laurelton, Queens Village, Springfield Gardens and St. Albans in Queens.

Life and career
A lifelong resident of New York City, Miller previously co-chaired the MTA Labor Coalition, which represents 29 unions and more than 60,000 workers, and President of Amalgamated Transit Union (ATU) Local No. 1056, representing drivers and mechanics who work for the Metropolitan Transportation Authority's Queens Bus Division. Miller led his union’s successful effort to secure fair wages, improve working conditions and better benefits for its members and safety reforms for the riding public.

New York City Council
Miller was elected in the 2013 New York City Council elections, securing the Democratic nomination from a crowded field of six candidates and then winning the general election with 96.9% of the vote. Miller is currently the only Muslim on the Council.

After his first election, he was appointed chair of the City Council Committee on Civil Service and Labor. Miller also became a member of the Black, Latino and Asian Caucus and the Progressive Caucus. In March 2014 Miller was named to the Council's new Policy Working Group. In 2016, Miller was arrested with Council Member Inez Barron and 41 others during a union protest outside Governor Cuomo's Midtown office demanding a state budget that includes "adequate funding for CUNY and a fair contract for its Professional Staff Congress". In 2017, Mayor Bill de Blasio signed two measures introduced by Miller aimed at reining in so-called dollar vans that are either unlicensed or break city laws while operating legally. In partnership with Council Member Donovan Richards, Miller also helped bring $426 million in capital investments to expand access to the New York City sewer system over several years starting in 2014. Miller has been a vocal opponent of the Governor's proposed congestion pricing in New York City, even writing an Op-Ed condemning the idea wholeheartedly. Following Hurricane Maria, Miller joined his NYC Council colleagues to Puerto Rico to survey the damage caused by the hurricane.

In 2017, Miller was re-elected to the New York City Council over his Democratic Primary challenger Anthony Rivers and Sondra Peeden. After his re-election, he was continued to serve as Chairman of the Committee on Civil Service and Labor. Miller was appointed to several other new committees under the new Speakership of Council Member Corey Johnson and elected co-chair of the Black, Latino and Asian Caucus.

Asked in 2021 to reflect upon his two terms in office, Miller remarked that foreclosure prevention and the development of new housing in Jamaica, Queens, the creation of Atlantic Ticket and its discounted Long Island Railroad fares, and public funding for Roy Wilkins Park to be among the highlights of his work in office.

References

External links

New York City Council members
Living people
New York (state) Democrats
African-American New York City Council members
1960 births
Cornell University School of Industrial and Labor Relations alumni
Politicians from Brooklyn
21st-century American politicians
Amalgamated Transit Union people
21st-century African-American politicians
20th-century African-American people